Altex is a breed of domestic rabbit developed, beginning in 1994, for cuniculture, specifically for the commercial meat industry. The Altex breed is not recognized by the American Rabbit Breeders Association (ARBA) or by the British Rabbit Council (BRC).

The name Altex is derived from Al plus Tex, referring to this breed's initial development at Alabama A&M University and at Texas A&M University–Kingsville. The breed was developed from Flemish Giant, Champagne d'Argent, and Californian stock, and later with New Zealand White crossings. Altex rabbits weigh  and have coat markings similar to the Californian rabbit: white with dark points.

See also

List of rabbit breeds

References

External links

Rabbit breeds
Rabbit breeds originating in the United States